Lymm Cross is in the village of Lymm, Warrington, Cheshire, England.  It is recorded in the National Heritage List for England as a designated Grade I listed building.

The cross dates from the early to mid-17th century and was restored in 1897.  It is constructed of sandstone and stands on an artificially stepped natural outcrop of red sandstone.  Its shaft stands in a square pavilion of red sandstone with square corner pillars.  It has a stone roof with a pedimented gable to each face and ball finials. Above the cross is an extension which carries a stone ball and an ornate weather vane.  On the east, south and west gables are bronze sundials of 1897 carrying the inscriptions "We are a Shadow", "Save Time" and "Think of the Last".

The adjacent stocks are separately Grade II listed.

See also

Grade I listed buildings in Cheshire
Listed buildings in Lymm

References

External links
Lymm webcam

Grade I listed buildings in Cheshire